Edmond and Corrigan is an Australian architectural firm based in Melbourne, Victoria, founded in the late 1970s by partners Maggie Edmond and Peter Corrigan, the firm's principals. The practice's work, both built and written, has been widely associated with the emergence of architectural postmodernism in Australia, an interest in suburbia and a search for an Australian architectural identity. Peter Corrigan taught design studios at RMIT University for over 30 years, until his death in December 2016.

Architectural practice

The practice of Edmond and Corrigan was officially formed in 1975, though the pair had gradually been collaborating and associating on projects after Corrigan's return from America in 1974. Much of their early work consisted of church buildings and community buildings for the Catholic communities of suburban Melbourne.

They designed the Keysborough Church of the Resurrection, completed in 1977, and later buildings in Keysborough. The project was published in 1977.

The practice's subsequent projects, many of them in suburban sites, continued with the idea of an Australian architectural language, visible in their competition entries for the Parliament House, Canberra Competition in 1977, The Australian Stockman's Hall of Fame and the State Library of Victoria, their many projects for community buildings, and their work for universities.

They later undertook larger projects; many of them, particularly RMIT Building 8, pursued the idea of  'a city in a single building'. Their Athan House of 1986 was published widely.

The practice also worked extensively in stage and set design for Opera Australia, Melbourne University Theatre Group, and La Mama.

Notable projects and awards
Athan House, Monbulk, Victoria, 1986–88: RAIA Victoria Chapter Bronze Medal for Outstanding Architecture Award, New Residential Category, 1989
Walsh House, Scheme for Pool Pavilion, 1993–94: Architecture Australia Prize for Unbuilt Work, 1994
Keilor Fire Station, 1991
RMIT Building 8 Extension, Melbourne, Victoria, 1990–94: RAIA Victoria Chapter Architecture Medal, 1995; City of Melbourne Building and Planning Award, Institutional Buildings Category, 1995; RAIA Vic. Chapter Institutional Alterations and Extensions Award, 1995; RAIA Walter Burley Griffin National Award for Urban Design, 1995
Windsor Fire Station, Windsor, Victoria., 1993–96: Metal Building Award, Certificate of Merit, 1996; RAIA Victoria Chapter Award of Merit, BHP Colorbond Steel Award, 1997; RAIA Victoria Chapter Award of Merit, Commercial Category, 1997
Oakleigh Fire Station, Oakleigh, Victoria., 1994
Greensborough Office and Carpark, Greensborough, Victoria, 1993–95
Ringwood Library Complex, Civic Plaza, Ringwood, Victoria, 1994–95: RAIA Victoria Chapter Urban Design Award, 1995; RAIA Victoria Chapter Award of Merit, Institutional Category, 1996
Stage I, Exhibition Centre Showgrounds, Ascot Vale, Victoria, 1996
RAIA Victoria Chapter Award of Merit, Commercial Category, 1997

Drama School, Victorian College of the Arts, South Melbourne, Victoria, 2001.
Niagara Galleries, Richmond, Victoria, 2001.
Allan & Maria Myers Academic Centre, Newman College and St Mary's College, Parkville, 2002. Dulux Colour Awards, Commercial Exterior Winner, 2002; RAIA Victoria Chapter, BHP Colorbond Award, 2002.

In 2003 Peter Corrigan was awarded the RAIA Gold Medal, 2003, the highest accolade of the Australian architecture profession. In 1993 he was awarded an Honorary Doctorate in Architecture from RMIT University.

Peter Corrigan has written about his practice's work and about others, explicitly stating the practice's goal of creating or fostering a particularly Australian architectural language.

References

Further reading

External links 
 Edmond and Corrigan P/L at Aardvark
 Peter Corrigan's webpage at RMIT University
 Ringwood Library
 Edmond and Corrigan Collection at RMIT Design Archives
 VCA Drama School Dossier

Architecture firms of Australia
University of Melbourne alumni
Academic staff of RMIT University
Architecture firms based in Victoria (Australia)